Paeroa Street Circuit is a 'hacksaw'-shaped temporary street circuit for motorcycle racing in downtown Paeroa, New Zealand.

The course runs around Belmont Road, Normanby Road and State Highway 2 with a right turn into Arney Street and then over the hill into Princes Street. The circuit then runs into the 'S' bends linking Wharf Street to Marshall Street, along the main straight to the hairpin opposite the Railway Reserve and back into Belmont Road. 

The motorcycle race meeting has been held during February since 1991 with the name ‘Battle of the Streets’ attracting participants from across New Zealand and overseas. It is one of the biggest motor racing meetings in New Zealand and the biggest sports event in the Thames Valley with around 13,000 to 15,000 spectators. 

The one-mile street lap is home to a wide range of classic and modern motorcycles, consisting of 11 classes that run throughout the day including:

 Junior Classics
 Senior Classics
 Post Classic Historic Pre-1972
 Post Classics – Forgotten Era Pre-1982
 Formula 2
 Formula 3
 Formula Paeroa
 Sidecars
 BEARS
 Super Motard 
 Robert Holden Memorial Race

References

External links

Official Website

Motorsport venues in New Zealand
Sports venues in Waikato